Pasifika New Zealanders are a pan-ethnic group of New Zealanders associated with, and descended from, the Indigenous peoples of the Pacific Islands outside of New Zealand itself (also known as Pacific Islanders). They form the fourth-largest ethnic grouping in the country, after European-descended Pākehā, Indigenous Māori, and Asian New Zealanders. There are over 380,000 Pasifika people in New Zealand, with the majority living in Auckland. 8% of the population of New Zealand identifies as being of Pacific origin.

History

Prior to the Second World War Pasifika in New Zealand numbered only a few hundred. Wide-scale Pasifika migration to New Zealand began in the 1950s and 1960s, typically from countries associated with the Commonwealth and the Realm of New Zealand, including Western Samoa (modern-day Samoa), the Cook Islands and Niue.

In the 1970s, governments (both Labour and National), migration officials, and special police squads targeted Pasifika illegal overstayers. Pacific Studies academic Dr Melani Anae describes the Dawn Raids as "the most blatantly racist attack on Pacific peoples by the New Zealand government in New Zealand's history".

Immigrant Pasifika families settled in the inner city suburbs of Auckland and other major cities in the country, when middle class Pākehā families were tending to move outwards to newer, more distant suburbs. Pasifika immigrants also tended to replace Urban Māori in central suburbs.

By the mid-1970s, gentrification became an issue for Pasifika communities in Auckland. The cheap housing found in Ponsonby and other inner city Auckland suburbs were attractive to Pākehā young professionals, especially socially liberal families searching for a multicultural and urban lifestyle. As these houses were purchased, the available rental stock plummeted, and Pasifika families who tended to rent more began to relocate to suburbs further out from the city centre. The Pasifika populations in Ponsonby and Freemans Bay peaked in 1976. Grey Lynn continued to have a large Pasifika population (particularly Samoan) until the mid-1980s.

Demographics 

There were 381,642 people identifying as being part of the Pacific Peoples ethnic group at the 2018 New Zealand census, making up 8.1% of New Zealand's population. This is an increase of 85,701 people (29.0%) since the 2013 census, and an increase of 115,668 people (43.5%) since the 2006 census. Some of the increase between the 2013 and 2018 census was due to Statistics New Zealand adding ethnicity data from other sources (previous censuses, administrative data, and imputation) to the 2018 census data to reduce the number of non-responses.

There were 191,391 males and 190,254 females, giving a sex ratio of 1.006 males per female. The median age was 23.4 years, compared to 37.4 years for all New Zealanders; 128,154 people (33.6%) were aged under 15 years, 103,752 (27.2%) were 15 to 29, 129,504 (33.9%) were 30 to 64, and 20,232 (5.3%) were 65 or older.

The majority of Pasifikia were born in New Zealand: 66.4% at the 2018 census, up from 62.3% at the 2013 census and 60.0% at the 2006 census.

In terms of population distribution, 243,966 (63.9%) Pacific people live in the Auckland region, 106,125 (27.8%) live in the North Island outside the Auckland region, and 31,542 (8.3%) live in the South Island. The Māngere-Ōtāhuhu local board area of Auckland has the highest concentration of Pacific people with a majority 59.4%, followed by the Ōtara-Papatoetoe local board area (46.5%) and the Manurewa local board area (36.3%). Porirua City has the highest concentration of Pacific people outside of Auckland at 26.3%. The Kaikōura district had the lowest concentration of Pacific people at 0.8%, followed by Waimate District and Queenstown-Lakes District (both 1.0%).

According to responses to the 2018 census, 91.6% of Pacific Peoples spoke English, and 37.8% spoke two languages.

Ethnic origins
At the 2018 census, 59.4% of Pasifika reported belonging to a single ethnic group. The largest Pacific Peoples ethnic groups – immigrants from a particular Pacific nation and their descendants – are Samoan New Zealanders (182,721 people), Tongan New Zealanders (82,389), Cook Island Māori (80,532), and Niueans (30,867).

In politics

In 1993, Samoan-born Taito Phillip Field became the first Pasifika member of parliament (MP), when he won the Otara electorate seat for Labour. Field was joined in 1996 by Samoan politicians Mark Gosche and Arthur Anae (the first Pasifika MP from the National Party), and by Winnie Laban in 1999. In 2008, Field left the Labour Party and formed the New Zealand Pacific Party, a short-lived political party aimed at representing conservative Christian Pasifika communities.

For the 2008 New Zealand general election, Samoan-born Sam Lotu-Iiga was elected as MP for Maungakiekie, and was joined by Labour list MPs William Sio and Carmel Sepuloni, who was the first MP of Tongan heritage. In 2010, Kris Faafoi entered parliament by winning the 2010 Mana by-election, becoming the first MP of Tokelauan descent. In 2011, Alfred Ngaro became the first MP of Cook Island descent by winning the Maungakiekie electorate. Further Pasifika MPs entered parliament in the 2010s: Asenati Taylor for New Zealand First (2011), Christchurch East MP Poto Williams (2013), Manukau East MP Jenny Salesa (2014) and Anahila Kanongata'a-Suisuiki (2017).

The 2020 New Zealand general election saw the largest cohort of Pasifika MPs entering parliament: Terisa Ngobi, Barbara Edmonds, Tangi Utikere, Neru Leavasa for the Labour Party, and the first Pasifika MP from the Green Party, Teanau Tuiono.

The Auckland Council has had three Pasifika counsellors since its founding in 2010: Alf Filipaina and former National MP Arthur Anae representing the Manukau ward since 2010, and Efeso Collins in 2016, replacing Anae's for the Manukau ward. In 2022, Collins announced his run for the 2022 Auckland mayoral election.

Gallery

See also

 Urban Pasifika, hip hop music
 Pasifika Festival
 List of ethnic origins of New Zealanders
 Culture of New Zealand

References

Ethnic groups in New Zealand
 
New Zealand people by ethnic or national origin
Oceanian-New Zealand culture
Oceanian New Zealander